The MTV Video Music Award for Best Direction is an award given to the artist, the artist's manager, and the director of the music video. From 1984 to 2006, the full name of the award was Best Direction in a Video, and in 2007, it was briefly renamed Best Director. The category acquired its current name with the 2008 awards.  The most frequent winners are Spike Jonze and David Fincher with three wins each, although one of Jonze's wins is credited as the "Torrance Community Dance Group".

The most nominated director is David Fincher with eight nominations.  Remarkably, seven of Fincher's nominations were achieved in a three-year span (1989–1991), as he was nominated a record three times in both 1989 and 1990.  Fincher's latest nomination (and win) occurred over twenty years later in 2013 for his work on Justin Timberlake's "Suit & Tie." Closely following him are Dave Meyers with seven nominations and Francis Lawrence with six. Hype Williams is the director with most nominations and no wins at five.

The performer whose videos have won the most awards is Madonna, whose videos have garnered three direction Moonmen. However, Eminem's videos have received the most nominations with seven.

Taylor Swift is the only performer to have won two Moonmen in this category for her work directing ("The Man" & “All Too Well: The Short Film'')

Five other performers have won a Moonman in this category for their work directing/co-directing their videos: George Michael ("Father Figure"), Beck ("The New Pollution"), Erykah Badu ("Honey"), Adam Yauch of the Beastie Boys ("Make Some Noise"), Kendrick Lamar ("Alright" and "HUMBLE.," as part of The Little Homies), and Lil Nas X ("Montero (Call Me by Your Name)"). An additional nine performers have been nominated for their work co-directing/directing videos: Busta Rhymes, Missy Elliott, Christina Aguilera, Jared Leto (as Bartholomew Cubbins), Ryan Lewis, Bruno Mars, Billie Eilish, Tyler, the Creator (as Wolf Haley), and Travis Scott.

Recipients

References

 
MTV Video Music Awards
Awards established in 1984
Awards for best director